Portrait of a Woman as Judith is a 1590-1595 oil on canvas painting by Agostino Carracci, now in a private collection. It is signed A. CAR. BON. (Agostino Carracci from Bologna) at bottom left.

Identification
The work was lost until re-appearing on the art market in 1985 thanks to a re-reading of its iconography by Australian art historian Jaynie Anderson identifying its subject as Olimpia Luna (died 1592) as the biblical figure Judith, with Holofernes' head modelled on her husband Melchiorre Zoppio (1544 – 1634), co-founder of the Accademia dei Gelati in Bologna, an association of writers, poets and scholars of which Agostino was probably a member. 

Anderson drew on several documentary sources, particularly the oration at Agostino's funeral in January 1603 (about a year after his death) by Lucio Faberi (or Faberio), notary of the Company of Painters in Bologna, as quoted by Carlo Cesare Malvasia in his chapter on the funeral in Felsina Pittrice (1678). This states it was painted after Olimpia's death, with Faberi stating "if it is a great deed to paint a portrait from nature, how much greater a deed it is to do the same when the subject is absent; it is certainly most great and marvellous to do such a thing, painting a person already dead, buried, unseen, without a drawing or imprint, but solely and simply from others' accounts ... As her husband relates [Agostino Carracci] made the portrait of [Zoppo's] wife Olimpia Luna, who was wife to the Most Excellent Melchiorre Zoppio". He goes on to add that Zoppio himself stated that he particularly appreciated the painting and dedicated a sonnet to it, which Faberi quoted in its entirety in his oration. 

Elsewhere in Felsina Pittrice Malvasia states that Agostino "made [for Zoppio] the portrait of his wife, already dead and buried, from [Zoppio's] memory, with a small portrait of himself in her hand", which Anderson identifies with the head of Holofernes. She also argues that the subject's rich golden dress, studded with jewels and pearls to shine like the moon, was a play on Olimpia's maiden name Luna (the Italian word for moon). In 1603 Zoppio wrote a short book, only published later under the title Consolation of Melchiorre Zoppio, moral philosophy on the death of his wife Olimpia Luna Zoppio (Consolatione di Melchiorre Zoppio, filosofo morale nella morte della moglie Olimpia Luna Z [oppio]). In it he described how he had a vision of a woman during a night of torment and how that vision revealed herself to be his late wife. The description of the vision's dress matches details in the painting, particularly its "turquoise dress, studded with pearls divided into flames representing shooting stars", adding that "all told, there was nothing in her that did not signify heaven to me". Though this does not match the colour of the dress in the portrait, it does match its pearl motifs of shooting stars, perhaps meaning the book was inspired by the painting not vice versa.

Not all art historians unreservedly accept Anderson's identification, especially since the funerary oration does not mention the fact that the double portrait was in the guise of Judith and Holofernes, a silence which is hard to explain given that fact's significance. The head of Holofernes also does not seem to match other known portraits of Zoppio, such as a print now in the National Library of Austria and a painted portrait, both probably copying the same source. Anderson argues that the portrait in the print matches the head of Holofernes, whilst others argue the two images are only generically similar in appearance.

Analysis

References

paintings by Agostino Carracci
Portraits of women
17th-century portraits
1595 paintings
Paintings depicting Judith